A.S.D. Real Metapontino is an Italian football club based in Montalbano Jonico, Basilicata. Currently it plays in Italy's Serie D.

History

Foundation
The club was founded in 2011.

Serie D
In the season 2012–13 the team was promoted for the first time, from Eccellenza Basilicata to Serie D.

Colors and badge
The team's colors are lightblue and blue.

Honours
Eccellenza:
Winner (1): 2012–13

References

External links
 

Association football clubs established in 2011
Football clubs in Basilicata
2011 establishments in Italy